The 2017 Liga Profesional de Baloncesto (LPB) season was the 44th season of the highest basketball division in Venezuela. Guaros de Lara won its first title after defeating Marinos in the Finals.

Teams

Venues and locations

Regular season

Western Conference

Eastern Conference

Play-offs
All rounds were played in a best-of-seven playoff format. The higher seeded team played game one, two, six and seven (if needed) at home.

Awards

Most Valuable Player

Grand Final MVP

References

External links
Official LPB website

2016–17 in South American basketball
Liga Profesional de Baloncesto seasons